A Hundred Times or More is Phosphorescent's debut album. The LP was released via Athens, Georgia-based label Warm Records. It was released on August 19, 2003.

Track listing
 "Salt & Blues"
 "Where to Strip"
 "Bullet"
 "Little, Pt. 1"
 "Little, Pt. 2"
 "How Far We All Come Away"
 "Remain"
 "Last of the Hand-Me-Downs"
 "Pretty, Pt. 1"
 "Pretty, Pt. 2"

References

2003 debut albums
Phosphorescent (band) albums